{{Infobox television season
| season_number   = 1
| image           = SurvivorTamil1.png
| bgcolour        =#AC1836
| caption         = Slogan: Survive to become a survivor.
| module1         = 
| country         = India
| num_episodes    = 91
| network         = Zee Tamil
| first_aired     = 
| last_aired      = 
| film_start      = 1 June 
| film_end        = 4 September 2021
| next_season     = Season 2
| episode_list    = #Episodes
}}Survivor 1 is the first season of the popular Tamil-language reality show Survivor Tamil. The show is hosted by actor Arjun Sarja. The show was shot in a remote island in Zanzibar in the country of Tanzania east of Africa, with 18 celebrity contestants known as "castaways". The show was premiered on 12 September 2021 on Zee Tamil and uncut episodes were uploaded on Zee5. The season also featured interviews with the eliminated contestants on Zee5. The show ran for 91 days. The prize money for the winner was ₹1 crore (US$1,34,000).

The elimination process of the show was similar to most other international versions of format, where contestants had to vote each other out. The show followed a similar format to what was shown on the American season called Survivor: Redemption Island, where once the castaway is voted out by the other contestants, they will be sent to a separate island called Moondram Ulagam where they will be asked to compete in a challenge. If they lose the challenge, they will be eliminated from the game. If they win the challenge, they will stay in the game. On the final day, the eliminated jury members will vote for the winner out of the top three finalists. After winning a narrow vote of 4-3-0, Vijayalakshmi Feroz became the winner of the first season while Saran Shakthi was announced as the runner up and Vanessa Cruez emerged as the 2nd runner up respectively.Survivor received mixed to positive reviews from critics and fans who praised the season's crew members and makers for giving out challenging tasks and blindsiding twists to the contestants.

Contestants

Before the show started Zee Tamil revealed 8 out of the 16 contestants, some of the notable celebrities joining the show as contestants such as Narayan Lucky, Vijayalakshmi Feroz, Nandha Durairaj, Vikranth, Besant Ravi, V. J. Parvathy, Gayathri Reddy, Umapathy Ramaiah, Srushti Dange and Lady Kash. While Inigo Prabhakaran and Vanessa Cruez joined as wildcard contestants on Day 19, Vijayalakshmi and Amzath re–entered the game on Day 50 as wildcard contestants. Overall 18 contestants appeared in the season as castaways.

The Total Votes is the number of votes a castaway has received during Tribal Councils where the castaway is eligible to be voted out of the game. It does not include the votes received during the final Tribal Council.

Castaways status

Castaways sent to Moondram Ulagam

After a castaway is voted out of tribal council they are sent to Moondram Ulagam also known as Third Island. each castaway there will need to win a challenge each week until 1 castaway is eventually sent to merger and resume their game in the main island. If a castaway loses a challenge they will be OUT of the island and game permanently. On Day 50 the Moondram Ulagam finally shut down and the remaining castaways merged into the main game castaways again. On Day 56 the Moondram Ulagam was opened again.
 The castaways names are all in order from who got out of the island.

Format changes

Although the main format is the same, this season introduced several notable differences from the American version of Survivor:

Filming length: This season is filmed over 90 days, compared to the 39-day length of most American seasons.
Airing format: This season airs daily with a focus on a task or tribal council. The American version largely produces one episode for every 1 day, culminating in an elimination; This season has 100 episodes. The first episode of the week features the Leader selection for the tribes, Reward and Immunity challenges, while the second featured  Island of the Dead (Moondram Ulagam), battle and Tribal Council.
Island of the Dead (Moondram Ulagam): A secluded area where voted out contestants competed against each other in duels to remain in the game. When only three contestants remained in the main game, the winner of the final Island of the Dead duel returned to the game. This twist has been used in other international versions of Survivor, and later appeared in the American version as Redemption Island.

 Survivor Uncut 
Daily after the airing of the episode on television, Zee5 releases Survivor Uncut, which provides the unseen events or footage taken place that wasn't aired on television, which has a longer episode running time. Usually the uncut versions are 2 hr long rather than 45 mins on TV.

 Survivor – Ennadhan Nadakkuthu Kaattukulla Survivor – Ennadhan Nadakkuthu Kaattukulla is an Indian Tamil-language television talk show about the reality television series Survivor Tamil. The host Jagan conducts the talk show with the weeks summary every Sunday.

 Season summary 
Sixteen castaways embarked on the journey of a lifetime in the pristine yet treacherous island in Zanzibar in the country of Tanzania. The contestants were divided into two tribes, Kaadargal, which was represented by the color yellow, and Vedarkal, which was represented by the color red. Eventually as the game goes on the remaining castaways will unite as one tribe. In first week, Gayathri from Kaadarkal and Lakshmi from Vedarkal are tribe leaders after facing challenges. Kaadarkal's first inaugural victory in the reward challenge caused them to underestimate their opposing tribe's mettle. On Day 5, Indraja and Srushti were eliminated from each of their tribes by each of their tribe leaders votes for being as a weak contestant of their tribe. However, both of them were later sent to an unknown island called Moondram Ulagam, which is an outcast twist tribe. When they arrived on the island they received a note saying "The Game Is Not Over Yet", which indicated that both Indraja and Srushti are not eliminated from the game; however on an unknown exile island away from their co contestants and original tribes. Here, the first immunity challenge was won by Vedarkal, which was a massive comeback of that tribe. At the first tribal council faced by the Kaadarkal tribe, Gayathri was blindsided by her fellow mates and was voted off. After the tribal council ended with Gayathri receiving the highest number of votes to be voted out, There was another twist. After Gayathri being voted out by her tribe she was sent to the island Moondram Ulagam. In Moondram Ulagam Indraja and Srushti, now Gayathri competed in a challenge but the contestant out of the three who loses the challenge will be permanently eliminated from the game. However, Srushti failed the challenge and was eliminated from the show. In second week, Vijayalakshmi from Kaadarkal and Amzath from Vedarkal are the tribe leaders. Again Vedarkal tribe won the successive challenges gaining consecutive rewards. Each tribe members were thought that skill to protect and defend themselves from any danger in the future of the game. Later each tribe members were compete and to expose their skills and hidden talents. Finally, Kaadarkal won the advantage for their upcoming immunity challenge. With a great comeback the Kaadarkal tribe won the successive challenges gaining their first immunity, which resulted in elimination of the Vedarkal tribe. During tribal council Parvathy received the highest number of votes to be eliminated and was eliminated; however, she also joined  Moondram Ulagam and was not permanently eliminated. In Moondram Ulagam Indraja and Gayathri, now Parvathy competed in a challenge; however, Indraja failed the challenge and was permanently eliminated from the show. In third week, Umapathy from Kaadarkal and Nandha from Vedarkal are the tribe leaders.

Tribes
The two initial tribes were Kaadargal, represented by a Ram and the color yellow, and Vedarkal, represented by a Bull and the color red. However the first 12 people voted out in tribal council will be sent to a mysterious dead island called Moondram Ulagam where they formed a new tribe, competing for a chance to return to the game. The final eleven players merged into the Kombarkal tribe, represented by an elephant and the color blue.

The game

 Episodes 

Tribe leaders
Each week, tribe leaders are selected for each tribe.

 Kaadargal  (காடர்கள்)
 Vedarkal (வேடர்கள்)

 Kombarkal (கொம்பர்கள்)

 Moondram Ulagam task history 
In Moondram Ulagam there were some tasks that offer rewards for the castaways in the island if they manage to win the task.

 Immunity idol 
In Survivor, anyone can find an immunity idol with the help of scroll or various different hidden clues around the island. Immunity idols help to safe a castaway from getting them voted out of the game if the idol is with them.

 Jury members 
On the 71st episode Arjun Sarja made a announcement saying that the next 7 contestants to get eliminated from the game will immediately become jury members and eventually vote for the "Sole Survivor" at the end of the show.

Twists
 On Day 5, Indraja and Srushti were eliminated from each of their tribes by each of their tribe leaders votes. However, Indraja and Srushti were later sent to an unknown island called Moondram Ulagam, which is an outcast twist tribe. When Indraja and Srushti arrived on the island they received a note saying "The Game Is Not Over Yet", which indicated that Indraja and Srushti are not eliminated from the game; however, on an unknown exile island away from their co contestants and original tribes.
 On Day 7, After the tribal council ended with Gayathri receiving the highest number of votes to be voted out, There was another twist. After Gayathri being voted out by her tribe she was sent to the island Moondram Ulagam.
 On Day 8 In Moondram Ulagam Indraja, Srushti and Gayathri competed in a challenge but the contestant out of the three who loses the challenge will be permanently eliminated from the game. However, Srushti failed the challenge and was eliminated from the show.
 On Day 14, After the tribal council ended with Parvathy receiving the highest number of votes to be voted out, There was another twist. After Parvathy being voted out by her tribe she was sent to the island Moondram Ulagam.
 On Day 15 In Moondram Ulagam Indraja, Gayathri and Parvathy competed in a challenge but the contestant out of the three who loses the challenge will be permanently eliminated from the game. However, Indraja failed the challenge and was eliminated from the show.
 On Day 19 two new contestants joined the game as wild card contestants, one of them was actor Inigo Prabhakaran and the other was model Vanessa Cruez.
 On Day 21, After the tribal council ended with Ram receiving the highest number of votes to be voted out, There was another twist. After Ram being voted out by his tribe he was sent to the island Moondram Ulagam.
 On Day 22 In Moondram Ulagam Gayathri, Parvathy and Ram competed in a challenge but the contestant out of the three who loses the challenge will be permanently eliminated from the game. However, Ram failed the challenge and was eliminated from the show.
 On Day 28, After the tribal council ended with Saran receiving the highest number of votes to be voted out, but he was saved by gold pearl crystals. There was another twist. Instead of him, he selected Vijayalakshmi to eliminate from the tribe. So, she was sent to the island Moondram Ulagam.
 On Day 29 In Moondram Ulagam Gayathri, Parvathy and Viji competed in a challenge but the contestant out of the three who loses the challenge will be permanently eliminated from the game. However, Parvathy failed the challenge and was eliminated from the show.
 On Day 39 Inigo Prabhakaran went to the Kaadargal tribe as a special guest; however, the Kaadargal tribe received a scroll that said that the special guest coming from the opposing tribe gets a special advantage to know where the hidden immunity idol is located in their island.
 On Day 42 Lakshmi Priya used her immunity idol in the tribal council the safe herself from being voted out of the game.
 On Day 48 The host Arjun Sarja announced that both tribes will not be playing as a team for the immunity challenge; however, they all will be playing the challenge as pairs. But each member will need to select a member from the opposing tribe and pair up with them, and the only pair who survives the challenge till the end will win immunity and be safe from tribal council.
 On Day 49 Host Arjun Sarja announced that since both of the tribes are in tribal council each tribe will need to vote out a member from the game. However, Saran and Lakshmi where voted out but Arjun gave a chance for one member to be safe again, if the member receives a black stone they will be safe but if they receive a white stone they will be eliminated. Saran received the black stone while Lakshmi received the white stone.
 On Day 50 the Moondram Ulagam concept finally came to an end, and the remaining members in the island merged with the main game castaways yet again.
 On Day 51 Both tribes Kaadargal and Vedarkal were dissolved and everyone merged into a new tribe called Kombarkal.
 On Day 71 Lady Kash quit the game permanently due to personal issues.
 On Day 78 Moondram Ulagam was permanently shut.
 On Day 86 Inigo and Vikranth lost the first finale knock out challenge and was eliminated from the game and became jury members.
 On Day 89 Narayan lost the knock out challenge and was eliminated from the game and became a jury member.
 On Day 89 Vijayalakshmi won the knock out challenge and became the first finalist.
 On Day 90 Umapathy lost the final knock out challenge and was eliminated from the game and became a jury member.
 On Day 90 Vijayalakshmi had the option to select one contestant and make them a finalist, she picked Vanessa and Vanessa later became the 2nd finalist of the season
 On Day 90 Saran won the final finale knock out challenge and became the third and last finalist of the season.

Voting history
Tribal councils only happens once a week.

 Ratings, reception and viewership Survivor Tamil managed to garner a TRP of 5.02 on its opening and an average of 4.06 for its first week, leaving behind debuts of some of India's popular reality shows such as Bigg Boss, Cooku with Comali, MasterChef India - Tamil and Super Singer''. The show generally received positive reviews both from the media and the audience after its launch.

Controversies

Safety negligence controversy

On 6 October 2021, Lady Kash made a three-minute statement on YouTube, talking about the production team not giving enough care about the health of the contestants participating. Lady Kash also said the team were making her go through sexual harassment and mental harassment. Kash also said the behaviours of the team members were inhumane and they were lacking on humanity. Kash also said that she exited the show in an injustice way on 28 September 2021 during the final days of the filming of the show. She also stated that three participants in the show were feeling unwell and were tested for COVID-19, and the results came out positive and everyone on set were feeling unwell but without any safety precaution the filming still took place.

Phone use controversy
Saran Shakthi was accused and proven guilty of using a mobile phone from which he borrowed from a crew member in the island to connect to his girlfriend who is overseas. However, he wasn't disqualified from the show and still competed, which created unfairness towards the co-contestants. He also accused fellow contestant Vijayalakshmi of using a mobile phone too, which is yet to be questioned.

References

External links
 

2021 Indian television seasons
2021 Tamil-language television seasons
Zee Tamil original programming
Tamil-language television shows
2021 Tamil-language television series endings